Louise Bourgeois: The Spider, the Mistress and the Tangerine is a 2008 documentary film about artist and sculptor Louise Bourgeois directed by Marion Cajori and Amei Wallach and distributed by Zeitgeist Films.

Synopsis
Louise Bourgeois: The Spider, the Mistress and the Tangerine chronicles the life and imagination of Paris-born artist Louise Bourgeois. Her process is on full display in this documentary, which features the artist in her studio and with her installations, shedding light on her intentions and inspirations. Throughout the documentary, Bourgeois reveals her life and work to be imbued with her ongoing obsession with the mysteries of childhood. Bourgeois has for six decades been an important and influential figure in the world of modern art. In 1982, at the age of 71, she became the first woman to be honored with a major retrospective at New York's Museum of Modern Art. She is perhaps best known for her series of massive spider structures that have been installed around the world. Filmed with unprecedented access to the artist between 1993 and 2007, Louise Bourgeois: The Spider, the Mistress and the Tangerine is a comprehensive examination of the creative process.

Music
In several places, the film contains an excerpt from the song O Superman by Laurie Anderson. The last part of the song, beginning with the line So hold me Mom, is used in correspondence to Bourgeois' theme of depicting the mother figure with spider sculptures.

During the credits, a remix of a song called Otte, written and sung by Louise Bourgeois herself, is heard. The film also shows her amused reaction to hearing herself singing this song.

Reception
The film has received mostly laudatory reviews, with 92% of critics responding with positive reviews at T-metric section of Rotten Tomatoes and a "certified fresh" rating.

DVD release
Louise Bourgeois: The Spider, The Mistress and the Tangerine will be released on DVD by Zeitgeist Films June 23, 2009.

References

External links
 Louise Bourgeois: The Spider, the Mistress and the Tangerine Official Site
 
 

2008 films
American documentary films
Documentary films about visual artists
Films about sculptors
2000s English-language films
2000s American films